Year 1355 (MCCCLV) was a common year starting on Thursday (link will display the full calendar) of the Julian calendar.

Events 
 January 6 – Charles IV of Bohemia is crowned with the Iron Crown of Lombardy as King of Italy in Milan.
 January 7 – King Alphonso IV of Portugal sends three men who kill Inês de Castro, beloved of his son Peter, who revolts and incites a civil war.
 February 10 – St Scholastica Day riot in Oxford, England, breaks out, leaving 63 scholars and perhaps 30 locals dead in two days.
 April – Philip II, Prince of Taranto, marries Maria of Calabria, daughter of Charles, Duke of Calabria, and Marie of Valois.
 April 5 – Charles IV is crowned Holy Roman Emperor in Rome.
 April 18 – In Venice, the Council of Ten beheads Doge Marin Falier, for conspiring to kill them.
 August – Battle of Nesbit Moor: The Scottish army decisively defeats the English.
 September 1 – The old town of Visoki is first mentioned in Tvrtko I of Bosnia's charter in castro nostro Vizoka vocatum.
 October 5–December 2 – Hundred Years' War: Black Prince's chevauchée of 1355: A large mounted Anglo-Gascon force under the command of Edward the Black Prince marches from Bordeaux in English-held Gascony 300 miles (480 km) south to Narbonne and back, devastating a wide swathe of French territory.
 Date unknown – Battle of Ihtiman: The Ottoman Turks defeat the Bulgarian Empire.

Births 
 January 7 – Thomas of Woodstock, 1st Duke of Gloucester, son of King Edward III of England (d. 1397)
 August 16 – Philippa Plantagenet, Countess of Ulster (d. 1382)
 probable
 Acamapichtli, 1st tlatoani (monarch) of Tenochtitlan (modern Mexico City), 1375-1395 (d. 1395)
 Manuel Chrysoloras, Byzantine humanist (d. 1415)
 Konrad von Jungingen, German 25th Grand Master of the Teutonic Order
 Gemistus Pletho, Greek scholar
 Foelke Kampana, Frisian lady and regent  (d. 1418)
 Mircea I of Wallachia (d. 1418)

Deaths 
 January 7 – Inês de Castro, lover of King Peter I of Portugal (murdered) (b. 1325)
 April 17 – Marin Falier, Doge of Venice (b. 1285)
 April 22 – Eleanor of Woodstock, countess regent of Guelders, eldest daughter of King Edward II of England (b. 1318)
 August 3 – Bartholomew de Burghersh, 1st Baron Burghersh
 October 16 – Louis of Sicily
 December 5 – John III, Duke of Brabant (b. 1300)
 December 20 – Stefan Uroš IV Dušan, Emperor of Serbia
 date unknown – Bettina d'Andrea, Italian lawyer and professor

References